The Brussels Agreement, 1984, was an agreement between the governments of the United Kingdom and of Spain concerning the territorial dispute over Gibraltar. The agreement was criticised by Gibraltar politicians for limiting the participation of Gibraltarians in their self-determination.

Background 
The Lisbon Agreement, 1980, did not provide an immediate solution to the problems resulting from the blockade of Gibraltar that had been imposed by Francisco Franco in 1969. The border did not reopen as planned, and London and Madrid continued to disagree over the interpretation of the agreement. Spain's admittance to NATO and the EEC provided the impetus that finally broke the deadlock in 1984.

Terms 
The Brussels Agreement was concluded in November 1984 and implemented in February 1985. Spain's application to join the EEC proved to be the key factor since Britain linked Spain's membership with the opening of the frontier with Gibraltar and threatened to veto the application otherwise.  The Brussels Agreement clarified and reactivated the earlier Lisbon Agreement, which had been subject to widely-differing interpretations, complicated Anglo-Spanish relations and delayed the full opening of the border. Under the agreement, the United Kingdom and Spain would hold talks over Gibraltar, and the British were prepared to negotiate on sovereignty. The agreement was signed by the Foreign and Commonwealth Secretary, Sir  Geoffrey Howe, and the Spanish Foreign Minister, Fernando Morán López.

These were key points of the Brussels agreement:

 Provision of equality and reciprocity of rights for Spaniards in Gibraltar and Gibraltarians in Spain.
 The establishment of the free movement of persons, vehicles and goods between Gibraltar and the neighbouring territory.
 The establishment of a negotiating process aimed at overcoming all the differences between Spain and the United Kingdom over Gibraltar.

Criticism 

The agreement was vocally criticised in Gibraltar since the Gibraltar government was invited to participate, but only as part of the United Kingdom's delegation. Another major deficiency from Gibraltar's perspective was that it did not allow for the discussion of differences between Gibraltar and Spain. The agreement was also criticised by Gibraltar politicians as the Gibraltar delegation was expected to form part of

Aftermath 
In the key 1988 elections, the Gibraltar Socialist Labour Party called for self-determination, expressed its opposition to the negotiations over the sovereignty and future of Gibraltar between Spain and the United Kingdom and opposed any transfer of sovereignty to Spain. It also asked for the withdrawal of the negotiations on the Brussels Declaration and opposed the Airport Agreement. The GSLP got 8 seats and a 58.2% of the popular vote.

See also 
Gibraltar Constitution Order 1969
Lisbon Agreement, 1980
2002 Gibraltar sovereignty referendum
Gibraltar Constitution Order 2006
Cordoba Agreement, 2006

References

Footnotes

Bibliography

External links

Politics of Gibraltar
History of Gibraltar
1984 in Belgium
Treaties concluded in 1984
Treaties entered into force in 1985
Treaties of Spain
Treaties of the United Kingdom
Gibraltar–Spain border
Spain–United Kingdom relations
1985 in Gibraltar
1984 in Gibraltar
Gibraltar and the European Union